The Glembays is a 1988 Yugoslav film directed by Antun Vrdoljak starring Mustafa Nadarević and Ena Begović. The film is an adaptation of Miroslav Krleža's 1929 play Messrs. Glembay (Gospoda Glembajevi) and was produced by Televizija Zagreb and Jadran Film.

Plot
It is a period piece set in 1913 in Zagreb (which was at the time part of Austria-Hungary) and follows members of the fictional Glembay family, headed by Ignjat Glembay (Tonko Lonza), a prominent banker, and his second wife baroness Castelli (Ena Begović). Eleven years after his mother's suicide, Leone Glembay (Mustafa Nadarević) returns from abroad to his family home in Zagreb. He is haunted by depressing memories, particularly by thoughts of his deceased mother, his sister who committed suicide, and the Baroness Castelli, his father's second wife. The only member of his family that Leone confides in is Beatrice (Bernarda Oman), his brother Ivan's widow, who in the meantime became a nun and renamed herself Angelika. Leone witnesses omnipresent hypocrisy in the family and is repulsed by the criminal means through which his family became rich. Ultimately, Leone confronts his father and the baroness.

Cast 
 Mustafa Nadarević...Leone Glembay
 Ena Begović...barunica Castelli
 Tonko Lonza...Ignjat Glembay
 Bernarda Oman...Beatrice, Sister Angelika
 Matko Raguž...Silberbrant
 Žarko Potočnjak...Puba Fabriczy
 Zvonimir Zoričić...Franz
 Zvonko Štrmac...Titus Androcius Fabriczy
 Zvonimir Rogoz...Older Gentleman
 Ksenija Pajić...beggaress Fanika Canjeg

Reception
In 1999, a poll of Croatian film fans found it to be one of the best Croatian films ever made.

Awards
The film won three Golden Arena awards at the 1988 Pula Film Festival, including Best Actor (Mustafa Nadarević), Best Supporting Actress (Ena Begović) and Costimography (Ika Škomrlj). However, Ena Begović refused to accept her award on the grounds that her part was in fact a leading role.

Trivia 
The actor Zvonimir Rogoz, the doyen of Croatian cinematography, was 100 when he made this movie.

References

External links

The Glembays at Filmski-Programi.hr 

1988 films
1988 drama films
1980s Croatian-language films
Serbo-Croatian-language films
Films directed by Antun Vrdoljak
Jadran Film films
Croatian films based on plays
Films set in Zagreb
Croatian drama films
Films based on works by Croatian writers
Yugoslav drama films